Adam David Tanner (born 25 October 1973) is an English former professional footballer.

Career
Growing up in Witham, Tanner played football locally, before joining the youth set-up at Tottenham Hotspur. In 1987, Tanner signed joined the academy at Arsenal. In 1989, Tanner signed for Ipswich Town, after rejecting an apprenticeship from Arsenal. During his time in the youth ranks at Ipswich, Tanner captained the youth team.

Tanner signed his professional contract with Ipswich at the start of the 1992–93 season and made his league debut on 2 January 1995 in the Premier League, scoring in a 4–2 victory against Leicester City. He also scored in a 1–0 victory against Liverpool at Anfield, the first time an Ipswich side had recorded a win at Anfield in their history.

On 4 February 1997, Tanner was suspended by the Football Association for three months when a drugs test uncovered traces of cocaine in his blood.  Both Ipswich manager George Burley and fellow player Simon Milton spoke as character witnesses for Tanner at the hearing. That season Tanner had made 16 league appearances in the First Division and scored four goals. He returned to action after his ban for the final three league games of the season.

In November 1999, Tanner was arrested after colliding with a parked car in Witham. As he failed to stop at the scene of the accident he was later arrested and a blood test showed that he was three times over the legal alcohol limit for driving. In January 2000 he admitted the offence in court. In February 2000 he was spared a prison sentence and instead ordered to do 80 hours of community service, placed on probation for 12 months, banned from driving for three years and released by Ipswich in the same month.

He joined Peterborough United, but failed to make a first team appearance and was released. He signed for Colchester United at the start of the 2000–01 season, before exiting Layer Road on 23 January 2001 and signing for non-league Canvey Island.

Tanner now works as a mortgage and protection consultant in his home town of Chelmsford, Essex.

Honours
Canvey Island
FA Trophy: 2000–01

References

External links
 

1973 births
People from Maldon, Essex
Living people
English footballers
Ipswich Town F.C. players
Premier League players
Doping cases in association football
English sportspeople in doping cases
Peterborough United F.C. players
Colchester United F.C. players
Canvey Island F.C. players
Association football midfielders